The Civic Democratic Party (ODS) is a liberal-conservative and soft Eurosceptic political party in the Czech Republic. The party generally sits centre-right to right-wing on the political spectrum, and holds 34 seats in the Chamber of Deputies, and is the second strongest party by number of seats following the 2021 election. It is the only political party in the Czech Republic that has always been represented in the Chamber of Deputies.

Founded in 1991 as the pro-free market wing of the Civic Forum by Václav Klaus and modeled on the British Conservative Party, the ODS won the 1992 legislative election, and has remained in government for most of the Czech Republic's independence. In every legislative election (except for that of 2013) it emerged as one of the two strongest parties. Václav Klaus served as the first Prime Minister of the Czech Republic after the partition of Czechoslovakia, from 1993 to 1997. Mirek Topolánek, who succeeded him as leader of the party in December 2002, served as Prime Minister from 2006 to 2009. In the 2010 election, the party lost 28 seats, finishing second, but as the largest party right of the centre, it formed a centre-right government with Petr Nečas as Prime Minister. In the 2013 legislative election, the party was marginalized by only securing 16 seats in the Chamber of Deputies, relegating the party to the opposition from July 2013 to December 2021. In the 2017 legislative election, it has partly recovered and secured 25 seats in the Chamber of Deputies, making it the second strongest party in chamber. The party is currently being led by the Prime Minister of the Czech Republic Petr Fiala, who has been leader since the 2014 party convention.

The ODS is a member of the International Democratic Union, and co-founded together with the British Conservatives the eurosceptic European Conservatives and Reformists Party (ECR Party) and the European Conservatives and Reformists (ECR group) in the European Parliament.

History

Formation
The party was founded in 1991 as one of two successors to the Civic Forum, which was a big tent movement that consisted of two major wings. The strongest wing was the Interparliamentary Club of the Democratic Right which was transformed into the ODS when Civic Forum split. ODS represented followers of Václav Klaus and was pro-free market, as opposed to the centrist Civic Movement. An agreement was reached to split the party in half at the Civic Forum Assembly on 23 February 1991. This was followed on 21 April by a formal declaration of a new party, and Klaus was elected its first President. The party agreed to continue in a coalition government with the Civic Movement, but this collapsed in July 1991.

The Civic Democrats, who represented demands for a tighter Czechoslovak federation, began to organize in Slovakia. Ahead of the 1992 election, the ODS ruled out an electoral alliance with the Liberal Democrats, but agreed to an alliance with Václav Benda's Christian Democratic Party (KDS) to boost its appeal to conservatives. The ODS won the election, winning 66 seats (and the KDS another ten), and formed a centre-right coalition with the Civic Democratic Alliance (ODA) and the KDU-ČSL, with Klaus as Prime Minister.

Dominant party (1992–1998) 
It was the dominant party in two coalition governments in the Czech Republic from 1992 to 1997, a majority administration (1992–96) and a short-lived minority government (1996–97).

On 2 June 1995, the ODS and KDS signed a merger agreement, which would come into effect on 18 March 1996, ahead of that year's election. However, at the election, whilst the ODS improved to 68 seats, its allies fell, leading to the government receiving only 99 seats: two short of a majority. Klaus continued with a minority government, relying on its acceptance by the Social Democratic Party (ČSSD).

In December 1997, allegations of the party receiving illegal donations and maintaining a secret slush fund caused the ODA and KDU-ČSL to withdraw from the coalition, and the government collapsed. Josef Tošovský was appointed caretaker, pending new elections in June 1998. Despite the scandal, Klaus was re-elected party chairman. In January 1998, some legislators opposed to Klaus, led by Jan Ruml and Ivan Pilip, left the party in the so-called 'Sarajevo Assassination' and formed the Freedom Union (US).

Opposition agreement
At the elections, the ODS fell even further, to 63 seats, while the US won 19. Due to the split, the Freedom Union refused to support the ODS, preventing them from getting a majority; the US's executive also refused to support the ČSSD. As a result, on 9 July 1998, the ODS signed the Opposition Agreement, which pledged the party to provide confidence and maintain a ČSSD government under Miloš Zeman. This agreement was then superseded by the more explicit 'Patent of Tolerance' in January 2000.

Opposition (2002–2006)
In the 2002 legislative election, the party went from being the largest seat holder to being the second largest party in the Chamber of Deputies with 58 of 200 seats, and for the first time in its history assumed the role of a true opposition party. Mirek Topolánek took over the party leadership. The former Czech president, Václav Klaus, has been the party's honorary president for his first term in the office. In the European Parliament elections in June 2004 and in Senate and regional assembly elections in November 2004, it received over 30% of the votes.

Return to government (2006–2013)

In the 2006 legislative election the ODS was the largest seat holder in the Chamber of Deputies with 81 seats. ODS originally aimed to make a deal with Czech Social Democratic Party but talks with the Social democratic leader Jiří Paroubek were unsuccessful. Mirek Topolánek then introduced his first minority cabinet that consisted of Civic Democrats and independents. It was designated on 4 September 2006 but lost a vote of confidence on 3 October 2006.

ODS then formed a government in coalition with the Populars (KDU-ČSL) and the Green Party (SZ). Projects of the cabinet included reform of public finances. Topolánek also discussed possible emplacement of United States Missile defense in the Czech Republic which resulted in public resistance.

The party suffered heavy losses in regional and Senate elections in 2008, losing all 12 regional governorships it had previously held. However, a year later, ODS won the European Parliament election, keeping all 9 seats and gaining more votes than in previous elections.

ODS-led government during Czech Presidency of the Council of the European Union 2009. Czech presidency had to deal with problems such as Gas crisis in Ukraine, conflict in Gaza or economic crisis. There were also controversies like Entropa but some aspects such as resolution of gas crisis were positively evaluated.

The Cabinet had lost a no confidence vote on 24 March 2009. The country was then governed by a newly formed caretaker Cabinet, which was nominated by ODS, ČSSD and SZ. Early elections were set for 9–10 October 2009 but were postponed to May 2010 due to unexpected developments in the Constitutional Court and House of Deputies

Civic Democratic Party won the second place after Czech Social Democratic Party and formed a centre-right Government with TOP 09 and Public Affairs. Public Affairs split from the government on 22 April 2012 but were replaced by LIDEM. The Civic Democratic Party was widely defeated in the regional election that same year, finishing third overall and winning only in the Plzeň region. The party also lost 2010 and 2012 Senate elections.

ODS nominated Přemysl Sobotka for president of the Czech Republic during the 2013 presidential election. Sobotka received only 2.46% of votes and didn't qualify for second round. ODS has held 2012 presidential primaries which Přemysl Sobotka has won. Sobotka's poor showing in the 2013 general election was seen as caused by the government's unpopularity and lack of support from the party. The party's leadership supported Karel Schwarzenberg of TOP 09 in the second round of the presidential election.

Opposition (2013–2017)

After resignation and fall of Cabinet of Prime Minister Petr Nečas ODS proposed Miroslava Němcová to the position of the Prime Minister to President Zeman saying that she will be able to form a coalition and succeed a vote of confidence in the Chamber of Deputies. However, President Zeman refused to appoint her and instead appointed Jiří Rusnok's Cabinet. After that, opposition called for a dissolution of Chamber of Deputies and early election (such vote was only recently made possible by a constitutional amendment). The motion of dissolution passed with 147 out of 200 votes (120 required), all parties except ODS, whose deputies left the chamber, voted for dissolution, including their former coalition partners Public Affairs and TOP 09. President Zeman then called on early elections on 25–26 October 2013. ODS suffered heavy losses. It gained only 16 seats and finished 5th. The party also lost elections of the European parliament and of Senate and municipal in 2014.

The 24th Congress of the Civic Democratic Party elected on 18–19 January 2014 a new leadership of ODS. The former rector of Masaryk University and minister Petr Fiala was elected as chairman. Member of the European Parliament Jan Zahradil was elected as first-vice-chairman. In his book Citizens, Democrats and Party Members (Czech: Občané, demokraté a straníci), Fiala said the party needs to be attractive to new, young people and ODS shall have experts on economics, health care, education, etc.

In the Chamber of Deputies ODS formed an informal coalition relationship with TOP 09 and both have been opposing laws such as Control report of Value-added tax. On 26 May 2015, ODS, TOP 09 and Dawn of Direct Democracy called an unsuccessful vote of no confidence of the Cabinet of Bohuslav Sobotka.

As of December 2015 opinion polls showed ODS with 8.6% nationwide. Some polling agencies and political commentators are of the opinion that ODS was on the path to become main centre-right party again.

On 16 January 2016, Fiala was re-elected as Leader of the ODS. ODS participated in 2016 regional and Senate election. It received about 10% of votes and its candidate's secured seats in all regions. 6 candidates nominated by ODS qualified for the second round for Senate. 4 of them were eventually elected Fiala then said that ODS returned to the position of the major right wing party.

Opposition and formal cooperation with TOP 09 and KDU-ČSL (2017-2021) 
ODS agreed to participate in the 2017 legislative election together with Freeholder party. Parties will present themselves during the campaign as ODS with the support of Freeholders. This agreement means that Freeholders will take 40 places on ODS candidacy list. In February 2017, ODS started a campaign called "We create program." which was series of tours to Czech regions with party leaders discussing priorities with supporters and potential voters for an upcoming election. On 19 April 2017, ODS introduced its tax program. The Civic Democrats want to lower taxes which they say would increase the income of Czech citizens. ODS also wants to decrease spending in social benefits and subsidies. Chief Whip Zbyněk Stanjura said that many people take advantage of social benefits even though they don't deserve it. These plans resembled those that ODS had in the 2006 legislative election manifesto. Tours concluded with Conference "Strong program for Strong Czechia" held on 22 April where ODS presented their election manifesto and candidates.

Following the 2017 Czech government crisis, ODS grew in polls, approaching the Czech Social Democratic Party. According to a poll by TNS Kantar, ODS would become the second strongest party, surpassing ČSSD and KSČM. ODS introduced its campaign for 2017 election on 29 May 2017. It is inspired by the British Conservative Party's campaign for 2017 general election. In the 2017 election, ODS sought to get more than 10%. According to poll by STEM/Mark in September. ODS would get 7.5% of votes.

ODS received 11% in 2017 legislative election and became the second largest political party in the Czech Republic. The party then won 2018 Senate election confirming its position as the main right wing party.

Civic Democratic Party, KDU-ČSL and TOP 09 formed bloc of conservative opposition parties in late 2020. The alliance was known as the "Three Coalition", before the parties launched their slogan and program on 9 December 2020, announcing that they would run under the name Spolu ("together") in the 2021 Czech legislative election. The conservative bloc announced that Petr Fiala would be their candidate for the post of prime minister.

The Bloc ran in 2021 Czech legislative election with Fiala as a leader. Opinion polls suggested that ANO 2011 would win the election but in an electoral upset ODS-led Spolu won highest number of votes and opposition parties won majority of seats in the Chamber of Deputies. Opposition parties signed memorandum agreeing to nominate ODS leader Fiala for the position of the new Prime Minister.

Return to power (2021–present)
ODS formed a coalition government with STAN, KDU-ČSL, TOP 09 and Piráti after the election. Petr Fiala became the new Prime Minister. ODS holds 6 seats in Fiala's Cabinet.

Ideology
The ODS is described as conservative, liberal-conservative, and conservative-liberal, supports economic liberalism, and is Eurosceptic. There are also multiple ideological factions in the party, including the national conservative faction, the national liberal faction, the neoconservative faction and the Christian socially conservative faction (former Christian Democratic Party).

The party's ideas are very close to those of the British Conservative Party, Swedish Moderate Party, and other liberal-conservative parties in Europe. The basic principles of the party's program are "low taxes, public finances and future without debts, support for families with children, addressable social system, reducing bureaucracy, better conditions for business, a safe state with the transatlantic links. No tricks and populism."

Many prominent politicians in the party openly oppose political correctness and call for tougher measures to combat radical Islam which they liken to Nazism.

Although the party was in power when the Treaty of Lisbon was ratified in the Czech Republic, ODS supports maintaining Czech sovereignty and integrity against the European Union, calls for a fundamental reform of the EU and strongly opposes any federalization of Europe in the form of the EU becoming a quasi-state entity. Following the EU referendum in Britain which resulted in the United Kingdom voting to leave, ODS leader Petr Fiala said the Czech Republic "should reconsider its priorities and strategy in the European Union" and if the Treaties were to be re-opened, negotiate new conditions for the country such as an opt-out from asylum rules as well as from the obligation to adopt the euro. The party is a member of the national-conservative European Conservatives and Reformists group.

The ODS is against immigration. The party supports compulsory measures for immigrants to speak the Czech language, learn about Czech history and adapt to local customs and cultures. ODS is also opposed to compulsory EU migrant quotas by arguing that the Czech Republic should have sovereignty over its own border control and that forcing nations to take in migrants without sufficient vetting or orderly processing and integration poses a threat to national security, social cohesion and native European culture. ODS believes that all individual nations should have the right to determine their own immigration policies.

ODS also supports the right of law abiding citizens to own and carry firearms, being the main reason Czech gun laws are much more liberal than in nearly all other European countries. This makes them different from parties they are based on, as most of them, especially British Conservatives, reject the idea that anyone has a right to own and carry firearms and other weapons, making the ODS much more similar to American Republicans in this matter, although they still support gun control measures (such as background checks, licenses and registration). ODS, especially its defense expert Jana Černochová, was one of the main supporters of embedding the right to keep and bear arms for the purposes of national security into the Czech constitution, although it was Social Democrat Milan Chovanec who originally proposed it. The amendment failed in the Senate. In 2021 a same bill passed.

Symbols

Name
Václav Klaus stated that the party's name represents the fact that ODS is based on the idea of civic freedoms. It also shows that ODS is a Civic Party, which differentiates it from other parties that existed prior to 1991. The adjective Democratic represents that ODS should protect parliamentary democracy.

Besides its official name, ODS also received some informal names from media. Party members are sometimes called "the Blues" or the "Blue Birds" and ODS is sometimes called the Blue Party due to the party's association with the color blue.

Logo
The first logo was introduced on 4 June 1991, created by Aleš Krejča. It was chosen from over 250 entries to a public competition.

A new logo was introduced in 1992, including the silhouette of a bird in blue. The logo was created by Petr Šejdl. In 1994 when the bird's tail was shortened and in 1998 the font was changed as a result of the "Sarajevo betrayal" of autumn 1997, in which ODS colleagues used allegations of bribery to precipitate the resignation of Václav Klaus' government while he was on a trip to Sarajevo. The party used this version until 2015 with modifications for individual election campaigns.

The ODS introduced a new party logo in a congress in Prague in 2015. The design of the bird was updated and flies upwards rather than to the left. The logo was designed by Libor Jelínek.

Organisation

Party structure
The highest body of the ODS is Congress which meets every year and elects leadership every two years. The party is led by the Executive Council and Republic Assembly in time between meetings of Congress. The executive body meets every Month and the party is led by Panel between meetings of the Executive Council. Panel consists of Party's Leader, Deputy Leaders and Chief Whips of the Parliamentary ODS.

ODS is structured similarly to the subdivisions of the Czech Republic. The structure consists of local associations. Group of local associations forms area. Areas are organised as parts of Region.

Membership

ODS had 18,500 Members in 1991. The number of members grew with the party's influence and soon rose to over 23,000. It decreased during political crisis in 1998 to 16,000. The party stopped the decrease after preliminary election and membership grew once again. It peaked in 2010 when it reached 31,011. The member base started to decline rapidly after 2010. It had only 17,994 members prior the 2013 election. ODS had 14,771 members in May 2015 and the member base was stabilised according to leaders of the party.

The party runs a membership organisation known as Supporters of ODS. It is a looser form of involvement with the party. It is meant for people who doesn't want to be members of ODS but sympathize with its program. It replaced the organisation known as Blue Team

Faces of ODS is a project of party's members who share their life's story. It was described as honour for all members of the party who didn't abandon it in hard times.

Young Conservatives

Young Conservatives (MK) is a youth wing of ODS. Young people from the age of 15 to 35 can apply for a membership in the MK. The founding congress of MK was held on 8 December 1991 as a result of previous preparations through Charter of Young Conservatives by a group of students at the University of Technology in Brno and Law Students' Association "Všehrd" from Faculty of Law at the Charles University. The Young Conservatives organize a wide range of events from meetings with local or national politicians to elections campaigns and international events.

CEVRO Liberal Conservative Academy 

CEVRO Liberal Conservative Academy is a think-tank affiliated with ODS. It was established in 1999. Its goal is political education which tries to spread liberal-conservative thinking. In 2005, CEVRO established its own private university known as CEVRO Institute. CEVRO has four newspapers – CEVRO Revue, The Week in European Politics, The Week in Czech Politics and Forthnightly.

International organisations
ODS joined the European Democrat Union (EDU) in 1992 as one of the first parties in the former Eastern Bloc. Václav Klaus even became a Vice President of EDU. ODS remained in the EDU until it became part of the European People's Party (EPP) in 2002. ODS refused to join EPP due to its ideological differences and instead became a member of European Democrats.

ODS joined International Democrat Union (IDU) in 2001. Chairmen of Civic Democratic Party served as Vice-presidents of IDU.

In July 2006, the Civic Democratic Party signed an agreement with the British Conservative Party to leave the European People's Party–European Democrats (EPP-ED) Group in the European Parliament and form the Movement for European Reform in 2009. On 22 June 2009, it was announced that ODS would join the newly formed European Conservatives and Reformists (ECR) parliamentary group, an anti-federalist and Eurosceptic group, which currently its third largest bloc in the European Parliament. ODS then became one of founding members of the European Conservatives and Reformists Party (ECR Party), a conservative and Eurosceptic European political party, defending broader conservative and economically liberal principles. Other members of ECR Party include Conservative Party, Law and Justice or Freedom and Solidarity.

Leadership

Current

Leaders

Note: Only properly elected leaders are included.

Election results

Chamber of Deputies

Senate

* Places are by number of votes gained.

Presidential
Indirect Elections

Direct Election

European Parliament

Local election

Regional election

2020 Czech regional election results

Prague municipal elections

Federal Assembly of Czechoslovakia
House of the People

House of Nations

Elected representatives
Civic Democratic Party has 23 members of the Chamber of Deputies.

Ivan Adamec
Jan Bauer
Martin Baxa
Petr Beitl
Marek Benda
Petr Bendl
Stanislav Blaha
Pavel Blažek
Jana Černochová
Petr Fiala
Jakub Janda
Martin Kupka

Karel Krejza
Jaroslav Martinů
Ilona Mauritzová
Vojtěch Munzar
Miroslava Němcová
Jan Skopeček
Zbyněk Stanjura
Bohuslav Svoboda
Jiří Ventruba
Jan Zahradník
Pavel Žáček

Civic Democratic Party has 16 Senators of the Senate of the Czech Republic.

Lumír Aschenbrenner
Jiří Burian
Martin Červíček
Ladislav Chlupáč
Hynek Hanza
Tomáš Jirsa
Pavel Karpíšek

Michal Kortyš
Rostislav Koštial
Raduan Nwelati
Zdeněk Nytra
Jiří Oberfalzer
Jan Tecl
Vladislav Vilímec
Miloš Vystrčil
Jaroslav Zeman

Civic Democratic Party has 4 MEPs.

Evžen Tošenovský
Veronika Vrecionová

Alexandr Vondra
Jan Zahradil

References

Bibliography

External links

  

 
1991 establishments in Czechoslovakia
Alliance of Conservatives and Reformists in Europe member parties
Civic Forum breakaway groups
European Conservatives and Reformists member parties
Eurosceptic parties in the Czech Republic
International Democrat Union member parties
Liberal conservative parties in the Czech Republic
Political parties established in 1991
Political parties in the Czech Republic
Political parties in Czechoslovakia
Right-wing parties in the Czech Republic
Conservatism in the Czech Republic